The Point Comfort and Northern Railway  is a Class III railroad operating in the U.S. state of Texas.

PCN was purchased by the holding company RailAmerica in 2005; RailAmerica in turn was purchased by Genesee & Wyoming.

The railroad's traffic largely comes from aluminum products from Alcoa World Alumina & Chemicals as well as plastics.

PCN hauled around 12,500 carloads in 2008.

References

External links

 Point Comfort and Northern Railway official webpage - Genesee and Wyoming website

Texas railroads
Genesee & Wyoming